This list covers television programs whose first letter (excluding "the") of the title is P.

P

PA
The Pacific
Pacific Blue
Pacific Drive (also known as Pacific Beach)
Packages from Planet X
Packed to the Rafters
Pac-Man
Pac-Man and the Ghostly Adventures
Page to Screen
Painkiller Jane
Pair of Kings
Pan Am
Panorama
Pantomime Quiz
Panty & Stocking with Garterbelt (Japan)
The Paper Chase
 Paper Moon
 Paprika
Paradise
The Paradise (2012)
Paradise Hotel
Paradise Run
Paranormal Challenge
Paranormal Lockdown
Paper Tales
Paradise PD
Paranormal State
Paranormal Witness
Pardon the Interruption
The Parent Game
The Parent 'Hood
Parental Control
Parenthood (1990)
Parenthood (2010)
Paris enquêtes criminelles (France)
Paris Hilton's British Best Friend
Paris Hilton's Dubai BFF
Paris Hilton's My New BFF
Parker Lewis Can't Lose
The Parkers
Parks and Recreation
The Partridge Family
Party at Tiffany's
Party Down
Party Down South
Party Line with The Hearty Boys
Party of Five (1994)
Party of Five (2020)
Party On
Pasadena
The Passage
Passions
Pass the Buck (Australia)
Pass the Buck (US)
Password
Password Plus
The Patty Duke Show
The Paul Lynde Show
Pat & Mat
Pat et Stanley
The Patrick Star Show
Paul Murray Live (Australia)
Paul Sand in Friends and Lovers
Paula's Home Cooking
Paul's Puppets
The Pauly D Project
Pawn Stars
Pawn Stars Australia
Pawn Stars UK
Paw Patrol

PE
Peaky Blinders (UK)
Peanuts (2014)
Pearlie
Peacemaker
Pearson
The Pebbles and Bamm-Bamm Show
Pecola
Peep Show (UK)
Pee-wee's Playhouse
Peg + Cat
Pelswick
The Penguins of Madagascar
Penn Zero: Part-Time Hero
Penny Crayon
Penny Dreadful
Pennyworth: The Origin of Batman’s Butler
Pensacola: Wings of Gold
People Are Funny
People Like Us
The People's Couch
The People's Court
Peppa Pig
Pepee
Pepper Ann
Pepper Dennis
Perfect Couples
Perfect Hair Forever
Perfect Strangers
The Perry Como Show
Perry Mason
Person to Person
Person of Interest
Persons Unknown
The Persuaders!
Perversions of Science
Pet Alien
Peter Gunn
Peter Loves Mary
Peter Rabbit (UK)
Petrocelli
Petticoat Junction
Peyton Place

PH
The Phil Donahue Show
Philly
Phil of the Future
The Phil Silvers Show
Phyllis
Phineas and Ferb
Phoenix
Phred on Your Head Show

PI
Picket Fences
Pickler & Ben
Pie in the Sky (British)
Piers Morgan Live
Pigeon Boy
Piggy Tales
Pingu
The Pillars of the Earth
Pinkalicious & Peterrific
The Pink Panther Show
Pinky and the Brain
Pinky Dinky Doo
PINY: Institute of New York
Pinwheel
Pirate Islands
Pirate Master
The Pirates of Dark Water
Pit Bulls & Parolees
The Pitch
Pitch
Pitch Slapped
The Pitts
Pixel Pinkie
Pixie and Dixie and Mr. Jinks

PJ
PJ Masks
The PJs

PK 

 P. King Duckling

PL
A Place to Call Home (Australia)
Plain Jane
Planet Earth (PBS, 1986)
Planet Earth (BBC, 2006)
Planet Sheen
Play Away (British children's TV)
Playhouse 90
Playing It Straight
PlayMania
Play School (Australian)
Play School (New Zealand)
Play School (UK)
Play the Percentages
Play with Me Sesame
Play Your Hunch
The Player
Please Don't Eat the Daisies
Please, Sir
Plim Plim (Argentina)
Plonsters

PM
PM Live (Ireland)
PM Magazine

PO
Pocoyo
Pogles' Wood (British)
Pointless (BBC)
Point Pleasant
Pokémon
Pokémon Chronicles
Poker Royale
Poko
Pole Position
Police Academy
Police Academy: The Series
Police POV
Police Squad!
Police Story
Police Woman
Police Women of Broward County
Police Women of Cincinnati
Police Women of Dallas
Police Women of Maricopa County
Polly Pocket
Poppee the Performer
Poppets Town (Canada)
Popples (1986)
Popples (2015)
Poppy Cat
PopPixie (Italy)
Police Women of Memphis
Politically Incorrect
Politicking with Larry King
Poochini
Pop! Goes the Country
Pop of the Morning
Popstars
Popular
Pop-Up Video
Pororo the Little Penguin
Porridge (British)
Port Charles
Portlandia
Pose
Postman Pat (SDS)
Potatoes and Dragons
Pound Puppies (1986)
Pound Puppies (2010)
Power
Power of 10
Powerless
The Powerpuff Girls (1998)
The Powerpuff Girls (2016)
Powerpuff Girls Z (Japan)
Power Players
Power Rangers
Power Rangers Dino Thunder
Power Rangers Jungle Fury
Power Rangers Lightspeed Rescue
Power Rangers Lost Galaxy
Power Rangers Mystic Force
Power Rangers Ninja Steel
Power Rangers Ninja Storm
Power Rangers Operation Overdrive
Power Rangers in Space
Power Rangers S.P.D.
Power Rangers Time Force
Power Rangers Turbo
Power Rangers Wild Force
Power Rangers Zeo
Powers (UK)
Powers (US)
The Powers of Matthew Star

PP
Private Practice

PR
The Practice
Prank Patrol (Australia)
Prank Patrol (Canada)
Prank Patrol (UK)
Pranked
PrankStars
Praise The Lord
Preacher
Preachers' Daughters
The President Show
Press Your Luck
The Pretender
Pretty Little Liars
Pretty Little Liars: The Perfectionists
Pretty Little Mamas
Pretty Wicked Moms
Pretty Wild
Prey (UK)
Prey (US)
The Price Is Right
The Price Is Right (US) (1956)
The Price Is Right (US) (1972–present)
Primetime
Primeval
Prime Minister and I (South Korea)
Prime Suspect (UK)
Prime Suspect (US)
Prime Time (Ireland)
The Prince
The Princes of Malibu
Prison Break
Prisoner
Prisoners of Gravity
Private Eyes
Private Practice
Privileged
Producing Parker
Profiler
The Profit
Profit
Project G.e.e.K.e.R.
Project Catwalk (Netherlands)
Project Catwalk (UK)
Project Runway
Project Runway All Stars
Project Runway: Junior
Project Runway: Threads
Project U.F.O.
Promised Land
Property Brothers
Property Brothers
Property Virgins
The Proposal
Pro Sportsman No.1 (Japan)
Protagonistas De La Musica
Proven Innocent
Providence
The Protectors (UK)
The Proud Family

PS
Psi Factor
Psych
The Psychiatrist
Psycho-Pass

PU
Puberty Blues
Public Morals (1996)
Public Morals (2015)
Pucca (South Korea)
Puffin Rock
The Punisher
Punk'd
Punky Brewster
A Pup Named Scooby-Doo
Pure Genius
The Purge
Pushing Daisies
Pussycat Dolls Present
Puppy Dog Pals

PV 

 P-Valley

PY
Pyramid (US)
Pyramid (Australia)
PythagoraSwitch

Previous:  List of television programs: O    Next:  List of television programs: Q-R